Monte is a 2016 Italian-American-French drama film co-written and directed by Amir Naderi. It premiered out of competition at the 73rd edition of the Venice Film Festival.

Plot    
In a remote past, identifiable with the period of the Middle Ages, in a semi-abandoned village at the foot of a mountain lives Agostino with his wife Nina and son Giovanni and with a little girl whose funeral is celebrated right at the opening of the film. The mountain overlooks the village and rises like a wall against the sun's rays that never reach their land, reduced to stones and scrub. People die of hunger and emigrate but the protagonist Augustine, despite all the suggestion to leave, does not want to submit to poverty and decides that the fate of his family is there, among the peaks.

Cast  
 Andrea Sartoretti as Agostino
 Claudia Potenza as Nina
 Zac Zanghellini  as Giovanni 
 Anna Bonaiuto  
 Marco Boriero as Capofamiglia

References

External links  

English-language Italian films
English-language French films
2016 drama films
Italian drama films
American drama films
French drama films
Films directed by Amir Naderi
Films set in the Middle Ages
2010s English-language films
2010s American films
2010s French films